This is a list of episodes from the NBC series Providence. A total of 96 episodes aired over five seasons.

Series overview

Episodes

Season 1 (1999)

Season 2 (1999–2000)

Season 3 (2000–01)

Season 4 (2001–02)

Season 5 (2002)

References

External links
 

Lists of American drama television series episodes